Mile Petković (born 12 August 1953) is a Croatian professional football manager. Petković managed a number of Croatian teams throughout the 1990s and 2000s, most notably first level sides Cibalia, NK Zagreb and Slaven Belupo.

References

External links
 Mile Petković Croatian First Football League stats 

1953 births
Living people
Croatian football managers
HNK Cibalia managers
NK Hrvatski Dragovoljac managers
NK Zagreb managers
NK Slaven Belupo managers
HNK Šibenik managers
Croatian Football League managers